The 1957 Milwaukee Braves season was the 5th season in Milwaukee and the 87th season of the franchise. It was the year that the team won its first and only World Series championship while based in Milwaukee. The Braves won 95 games and lost 59 to win the National League pennant by eight games over the second-place St. Louis Cardinals.

The club went on to the 1957 World Series, where they faced the New York Yankees. Pitcher Lew Burdette was the star and Most Valuable Player, winning three games, including the crucial seventh game played in New York City.

Offseason 
 October 15, 1956: Jack Daniels and cash were traded by the Braves to the Toronto Maple Leafs for Carl Sawatski.
 December 3, 1956: Roger McCardell was drafted from the Braves by the New York Giants in the 1956 minor league draft.
 Prior to 1957 season (exact date unknown)
Marshall Bridges was acquired from the Braves by the Sacramento Solons.
Merritt Ranew was signed as an amateur free agent by the Braves.

Regular season

Season summary 
The Braves finished the regular season with a 95–59 record, and they scored 772 runs while giving up 613. They played their home games in Milwaukee County Stadium, where they sold just over 2,220,000 tickets, tops in the National League.

Offense 
The Braves were led on offense by right fielder Hank Aaron, who won the National League Most Valuable Player award in just his fourth year in the major leagues. Fielding well in 151 games in right field, Aaron also led the National League with 118 runs scored, 44 home runs, a career high of 132 runs batted in, and 369 total bases. He also struck out just 58 times. Aaron also finished high in the league standings with 198 hits, a .322 batting average, and a .600 slugging percentage.

Another offensive star was third baseman Eddie Mathews. On June 12, Mathews hit the 200th home run of his career. For the season, Matthews was second on the team with 167 hits, 109 runs scored, 32 home runs, 94 runs batted in, and 148 games played.

In addition, the Braves' new second baseman, Red Schoendienst, was acquired in a trade on June 15, and he played in 93 games. Given up in this trade were Bobby Thomson (who was batting just .236) and Danny O'Connell (who was batting just .235). Wes Covington was the main replacement for Thomson in left field. Covington played in 96 games, batted .284, and batted in 65 runs, third on the team.

Del Crandall was the Braves' catcher in 118 of the 154 games. Del Rice was his primary backup, and he played in 54 games, including pinch-hitting.

Pitching 
Starting pitcher Warren Spahn was the Cy Young Award winner as the best pitcher in Major League Baseball, the first left-handed pitcher to win the award. Spahn finished with 35 games started with a 21–11 record. He also relieved in four games, saving three of those. Spahn led the National League with 21 wins and 18 complete games, and he had a 2.69 earned-run average in 271 innings pitched. Spahn was backed up by starters Bob Buhl (18–7) and Lew Burdette (17–9).

Manager 
Fred Haney, coming off his good performance in 1956, managed the Braves for the entire season in 1957. Haney also led the Braves to the top of the regular-season standings in 1958 and 1959, including the 1958 World Series, but after 1959, he never managed another Major League team again, although he did become the general manager of the Los Angeles Angels.

Injuries 

The Braves overcame two serious injuries during the 1957 season that caused some players to miss large parts of the year. First baseman Joe Adcock was injured in mid-season, and only played in 65 games, in which he batted in 38 runs. Frank Torre filled in for him and batted .272 in 129 games. Center fielder Bill Bruton injured his knee after playing in just 79 games, missing the rest of the season. He was replaced by Andy Pafko, who played in 83 games.

Opening Day lineup

Notable transactions 
 June 15, 1957: Danny O'Connell, Ray Crone, and Bobby Thomson were traded by the Braves to the New York Giants for Red Schoendienst.

Season standings

Record vs. opponents

Roster

Player stats

Batting

Starters by position 
Note: Pos = Position; G = Games played; AB = At bats; H = Hits; Avg. = Batting average; HR = Home runs; RBI = Runs batted in

Other batters
Note: G = Games played; AB = At bats; H = Hits; Avg. = Batting average; HR = Home runs; RBI = Runs batted in

Pitching

Starting pitchers
Note: G = Games pitched; IP = Innings pitched; W = Wins; L = Losses; ERA = Earned run average; SO = Strikeouts

Other pitchers
Note: G = Games pitched; IP = Innings pitched; W = Wins; L = Losses; ERA = Earned run average; SO = Strikeouts

Relief pitchers
Note: G = Games pitched; W = Wins; L = Losses; SV = Saves; ERA = Earned run average; SO = Strikeouts

1957 World Series 

This was the Braves' first World Championship since the "Miracle Braves" of 1914, and their only one while based in Milwaukee (out of two chances). To date, the Braves' have won two World Championships: one in the 1995 World Series, when the now-Atlanta Braves defeated the Cleveland Indians, and the second in the 2021 World Series, when Atlanta defeated the Houston Astros.

World Series MVP Lew Burdette won two games in Yankee Stadium and one game in Milwaukee County Stadium. Warren Spahn had the other Braves's victory.

Summary
NL Milwaukee Braves (4) vs. AL New York Yankees (3)

Composite line score
1957 World Series (4–3): Milwaukee Braves (N.L.) over New York Yankees (A.L.)

Awards and honors
 Hank Aaron, National League Most Valuable Player
 Warren Spahn, starting pitcher, the Major League Baseball Cy Young Award

World Series awards 
 Lew Burdette, World Series Most Valuable Player
 Lew Burdette, Babe Ruth Award

All-Stars 
1957 Major League Baseball All-Star Game
 Hank Aaron, OF, starter
 Lew Burdette, P, reserve
 Johnny Logan, IF, reserve
 Eddie Mathews, IF, reserve
 Red Schoendienst, IF, reserve
 Warren Spahn, P, reserve

Farm system

LEAGUE CHAMPIONS: Atlanta, Evansville, Salinas

References

External links
1957 Milwaukee Braves team at Baseball-Reference

Milwaukee Braves seasons
Milwaukee Braves season
National League champion seasons
World Series champion seasons
Milwau